Fedaiella  is an extinct genus of sea snail, a marine gastropod mollusc in the family Fedaiellidae, within the clade Neritimorpha.

Species
 Fedaiella beneckei † Böhm 1895 
 Fedaiella cuccensis † Kittl 1894
 Fedaiella elongata † Münster 1841
 Fedaiella fastosa † Stoppani 1857
 Fedaiella ingens † Kittl 1894
 Fedaiella lemniscata † Hoernes 1856
 Fedaiella meriani † Hoernes 1856
 Fedaiella monstrum † Stoppani 1857
 Fedaiella neritacea † Münster 1841
 Fedaiella prolixa † Stoppani 1857
 Fedaiella retropunctata † Stoppani 1857
 Fedaiella stoppanii † Marini 1896

Distribution
Fossils of Fedaiella are found in the marine strata of the Quaternary of Japan, Paleocene of Poland and Triassic of Italy.

References
Paleobiology Database

Gastropod genera
Prehistoric gastropods
Fedaiellidae